Ed Kalegi is an American voice actor, radio personality, host, and actor based in the New York City area and born in 1967.  He currently serves as the host of "The Weekend with Ed Kalegi," which is syndicated nationally by the Envision Radio Network.  The program is heard coast to coast on Radio and is also available via Audioboom and iHeartRadio. The show is a new take on Talk Radio, mixing light Comedy and Lifestyle stories.  The show deals with Entertainment, Health, Travel, Business, Sports, Parenting, Film, and more. Guests have included Carol Burnett, Dick Cavett, Anderson Cooper, Mitch McConnell, Chris Hemsworth, Julie Andrews, Melissa Gilbert, Deion Sanders, Henry Winkler,  and others. He is also the afternoon Traffic/Weather/Sports personality on WBBR (Bloomberg 1130) Radio in New York City.  From 2007 to 2011, He was the public address announcer of the Staten Island Yankees, a minor league affiliate of the New York Yankees as well as the public address announcer of the New Jersey Ironmen of the Xtreme Soccer League and a public address announcer for the New Jersey Devils of the National Hockey League.

Kalegi is a familiar face and voice in New York City; he has co-hosted events with Jon Stewart, Joan Rivers, Daisy Fuentes and Star Jones, along with sports celebrities Carl Banks and Darryl Strawberry, among others.

Kalegi appeared as the stadium announcer in the motion picture Sugar. He has also appeared in starring roles in the films Borrowed Dog and Angels.  He appeared opposite Kevin Kline, Paul Dano, and Katie Holmes in "The Extra Man." Kalegi also played a radical talk radio host in the film "Blindfold."

On television, Kalegi has appeared in several shows including Law and Order SVU, Kings, "Fringe," and "Damages." In 2009, he hosted "In The Zone" on UBATV.com. He is a member of SAG-AFTRA.

He is heard in commercials, narrations, radio and TV imaging and audiobooks. In 2008, Kalegi was the voice of a PBS documentary on sculpture.

Early life and career

Kalegi was born in Jersey City, New Jersey and raised in Edison, New Jersey. He attended Bishop George Ahr High School in Edison and then Rutgers University.

Kalegi lives in Metuchen, New Jersey with his wife and son.

References

External links
 America Weekend website Ed Kalegi page
New Jersey Ironmen bio
Ed Kalegi official website

1967 births
Living people
St. Thomas Aquinas High School (New Jersey) alumni
Rutgers University alumni
American male voice actors
Public address announcers
People from Edison, New Jersey
People from Metuchen, New Jersey